Charles Salmon could refer to: 

Carty Salmon (1860–1917), Australian politician
Charles B. Salmon, Jr., U.S. Ambassador to Laos
Charles Salmon (film producer)